Sandrine Capy (born 19 January 1969) is a French football player who played as goalkeeper for French club Juvisy of the Division 1 Féminine. Capy won 5 Division 1 Féminine titles.

International career

Capy was also part of the French team at the 2005 European Championships.

Honours

Official
Division 1 Féminine (Champions of France) (level 1)
Winners (4): 1994–95, 1995–96, 1996–97, 2002–03

References

1969 births
Living people
People from Lille
French women's footballers
France women's international footballers
Paris FC (women) players
Women's association football goalkeepers
Division 1 Féminine players